Deepak Bohara is a Nepalese politician and member of the Rastriya Prajatantra Party. He was elected in 2022 from Rupandehi 3 to the House of Representatives.

See also 

 Rastriya Prajatantra Party

References 

Rastriya Prajatantra Party politicians
Living people
Nepal MPs 2022–present
Members of the 2nd Nepalese Constituent Assembly
Members of the Rastriya Panchayat
1951 births